Cooper is an unincorporated community in Seneca County, in the U.S. state of Ohio.

History
A post office called Cooper was established in 1899, and remained in operation until 1903. The advent of Rural Free Delivery caused Cooper's post office to be discontinued.

References

Unincorporated communities in Seneca County, Ohio
Unincorporated communities in Ohio